Ladytown is a village and townland located in County Kildare, Ireland.

References

Towns and villages in County Kildare